Eichenwald is a surname, which literally means "oak forest" in German and Yiddish languages. In Russian language, the surname is rendered as "Айхенва́льд", which may by transliterated into English as Aikhenvald or  Aykhenvald.

Bearers of this  surname include:
Alexander Eichenwald (1864 – 1944), Russian physicist
Harry Wald, born Hans Eichenwald
Kurt Eichenwald
Yuly Aykhenvald
Alexandra Aikhenvald
Natalia Shvedova (maiden name Айхенва́льд)

German-language surnames
Yiddish-language surnames